Patrick Sutter (born 18 January 1999) is a Swiss football player. He plays for St. Gallen.

Club career
He was raised in the youth system of St. Gallen and started playing for their U21 team in Swiss 1. Liga in 2017.

He made his Swiss Super League debut for St. Gallen on 24 April 2021 in a game against Vaduz.

References

External links
 

1999 births
Living people
Swiss men's footballers
Association football midfielders
FC St. Gallen players
FC Winterthur players
SC Brühl players
Swiss 1. Liga (football) players
Swiss Promotion League players
Swiss Super League players